The Black Cauldron: Original Motion Picture Soundtrack is the soundtrack album to the animated dark fantasy adventure film The Black Cauldron. The 25th Disney animated feature film, unlike other ventures, does not feature any songs, which was a rarity in Disney films. The film, however, featured musical score composed by Elmer Bernstein. Due to the last-minute revisions, much of Bernstein's score were cut and unused. In its minority, the score was re-recorded for the album's first release by Varèse Sarabande in 1985, with Bernstein conducting the Utah Symphony Orchestra. The album soon fell out of print and many of the film's score did not resurface until a bootleg copy entitled "Taran" was supplied to soundtrack specialty outlets in 1986. The full score was re-issued by Intrada Records on April 3, 2012 which consisted of 75-minutes long.

Critical response 

The score received positive reviews from music critics, and today is regarded as obscure but one of the best works by Bernstein and for a Disney animated film. Critics however criticised the inconsistent editing and mixing production of the score, which they felt it as "somewhat lost". Jason Ankeny from AllMusic gave to the soundtrack a positive review, stating that "The Black Cauldron contains no vocal performances or comedic elements, instead embracing the conventions of traditional symphonic music in an attempt to lend new depth and gravitas to family-friendly filmmaking. Bernstein's bleak arrangements and ominous melodies vividly underline the fantasy world portrayed onscreen, and taken purely on its own terms, the score is an undeniable success." 

The website Filmtracks wrote: "The score for The Black Cauldron was for Bernstein what Mulan was for Jerry Goldsmith in the next decade: a fascinating journey into a fresh realm that required its music to play a more significant role in the film". It further opined that, "Somewhere in the process of creating the ambitious musical environment for The Black Cauldron, Bernstein lost the narrative romanticism that exists as part of the animated formula, despite his impressive attention to subtle motific manipulation throughout. Perhaps the lack of this formula approach is a refreshing take on an otherwise tired idea at the time, but it may also have contributed to the demise of the picture. The score remains something of an anomaly for the composer during this era, but it's a source of fascination nonetheless." James Southall of Movie Wave wrote " At times the composer is able to stick to genuinely dark areas, focusing on the lower registers of all the sections of the orchestra and providing bold accompaniment which recalls the finer moments of those other fantasy scores."

Track listing

Original edition

2012 release (re-mastered)

Release history

Personnel 
Credits adapted from CD liner notes.

 Elmer Bernstein – composer, conductor
 Fred Mitchell, Gene Shiveley – editor
 Bruce Leek – recording engineer
 Robert Townson – executive producer
 Patricia Sullivan – mastering
 Cynthia Millar – Ondes Martenot 
 Utah Symphony Orchestra – performer
 George Korngold – album producer

References 

1985 soundtrack albums
Walt Disney Records soundtracks
Varèse Sarabande soundtracks
Intrada Records soundtracks
Disney animation soundtracks
The Chronicles of Prydain